is a railway station in the city of Shibata, Niigata, Japan, operated by East Japan Railway Company (JR East).

Lines
Tsukioka Station is served by the Uetsu Main Line, and is 17.8 kilometers from the starting point of the line at Niitsu Station.

Station layout
The station consists of one  island platform connected to the station building by a footbridge. However, only one side of the platform is in use, and serves bi-directional traffic.  The station is unattended.

Platforms

History
It was renamed to its present name on 1 September 1950. With the privatization of Japanese National Railways (JNR) on 1 April 1987, the station came under the control of JR East.

Surrounding area
 
 Tsukioka Onsen

See also
 List of railway stations in Japan

External links

 JR East station information 

Stations of East Japan Railway Company
Railway stations in Niigata Prefecture
Uetsu Main Line
Railway stations in Japan opened in 1912
Shibata, Niigata